LeBron Raymone "Bronny" James Jr. (born October 6, 2004) is an American basketball player who attends Sierra Canyon School in Chatsworth, Los Angeles, California. He was named a McDonald's All-American as a senior in 2023 and is a consensus four-star recruit. James is the eldest child of professional basketball player LeBron James.

Early life and career
Bronny James was born on October 6, 2004, to then-reigning NBA Rookie of the Year, LeBron James, aged 19, and his then-girlfriend Savannah Brinson, aged 18. He was raised by both of his parents, and they married in 2013. As a child, James played several sports including basketball and soccer, but his father did not allow him to play football or ice hockey over safety concerns. By the time he was 10 years old, his highlights from youth basketball games were drawing national attention. During his childhood, James played for the Miami City Ballers, with whom he was teammates with Jett Howard, and the Houston-based Gulf Coast Blue Chips. In middle school, he competed for the North Coast Blue Chips, a team that included Mikey Williams. James also played for Old Trail School in Bath Township, Summit County, Ohio, where he attended middle school, and led his team to an Independent School League tournament win. In July 2018, a youth game featuring James was canceled after a fan wearing a Michael Jordan jersey heckled his father and was denied entrance. On August 6, 2018, he enrolled at Crossroads School, a private K–12 school in Santa Monica, California. California state rules prevented him from immediately joining the varsity team because he was in eighth grade. On December 3, 2018, in his first game for the school, James scored 27 points in a 61–48 victory over Culver City Middle School. In April 2019, he made his Nike Elite Youth Basketball League (EYBL) debut with Strive for Greatness.

High school career

Freshman season

On May 29, 2019, James transferred to Sierra Canyon School, a private K–12 school in Chatsworth, Los Angeles, for his freshman year of high school. He joined the school with his brother Bryce and incoming senior Zaire Wade, son of Dwyane Wade, a longtime teammate of James's father. Sierra Canyon's basketball program, under head coach Andre Chevalier, was one of the best in the nation and won the previous two California Interscholastic Federation (CIF) Open Division state titles. The 2019–20 team was led by five-star recruits, Brandon Boston Jr. and Ziaire Williams, who transferred there for their senior years. Entering the season, ESPN announced that its networks would air 15 of the team's games. Despite heavy media attention, James' father barred him from being interviewed.

On November 21, 2019, James made his high school debut, scoring 10 points off the bench in a 91–44 win over Montgomery High School. On December 14, he scored 15 points, including a go-ahead layup, and was named game most valuable player (MVP) in a 59–56 victory over his father's alma mater, St. Vincent–St. Mary High School. On January 15, 2020, James scored a season-high 17 points in a 117–62 win over Viewpoint School. Five days later, during a Hoophall Classic game against Paul VI Catholic High School, an orange peel was thrown by a young fan at James, causing a brief stoppage of play. Although the offender was not immediately identified, a clip of the incident went viral, drawing criticism from James' father, and the fan issued an apology. Sierra Canyon reached the Open Division state championship game, which was canceled due to the COVID-19 pandemic. As a freshman, James averaged 4.1 points in 15 minutes per game, as Sierra Canyon finished with a 30–4 record, and was his team's only player to appear in all 34 games of the season.

Sophomore season
On November 12, 2020, James played his first preseason game as a sophomore for California Basketball Club (CBC), a travel team representing Sierra Canyon, against Air Nado, a team affiliated with Coronado High School, at the High School Showcase. He scored nine points, all in the first half. In February 2021, James tore his meniscus at practice and underwent surgery. Due to the COVID-19 pandemic, he had not played any official games for Sierra Canyon in the 2020–21 season, which was set to begin later that year. After missing most of the season, James returned against Centennial High School in the CIF Southern Section Open Division final on June 11. He scored seven points in an 80–72 loss. Sierra Canyon, led by junior Amari Bailey, finished the season with a 16–2 record.

Junior season
In James' junior season, his Sierra Canyon team was led by seniors Amari Bailey and Kijani Wright. On December 4, 2021, he scored a game-high 19 points in a 71–53 win over St. Vincent–St. Mary High School in the Chosen-1's Invitational at the Staples Center, as Bailey was sidelined with an ankle injury. His team was upset by Harvard-Westlake School in the CIF Southern Section Open Division semifinals, where he scored four points.

Sierra Canyon reached the Open Division regional final, losing to Centennial High School, 83–59, and James was held scoreless while playing through hip soreness. The team ended the season with a 26–5 record. As a junior, James averaged 8.8 points, 3.3 rebounds, 2.8 assists and 1.9 steals per game in 29 appearances.

Senior season
In his senior season, James stepped into a leading role alongside junior Isaiah Elohim and became Sierra Canyon's top playmaker. He was joined on the team by his younger brother, Bryce. In August 2022, he played alongside his Sierra Canyon teammates for CBC in three exhibition games in Europe. In his second game, James led all scorers with 25 points in a 97–85 loss to U18 French Select in Paris. On October 29, James and his team were evacuated from a preseason game against the Hyattsville Stags, a team representing DeMatha Catholic High School, after a fight broke out in the stands and a fan reported seeing a gun. Although no firearms were found, the game was not resumed.

After missing the first two regular season games with an illness, James made his senior debut on November 26, recording 13 points, four assists and three rebounds in a 63–60 overtime loss to Rancho Christian School. In his first home game on November 30, he scored 25 points in a 77–61 win over Crossroads School. In January 2023, James missed four games with a knee injury and scored 19 points in his return on February 1 as his team lost to Notre Dame High School, 88–61, at the Mission League semifinals. Sierra Canyon was relegated from the CIF Open Division to Division I after its worst performance in the regular season and Southern Section Open Division playoffs in the tenure of Andre Chevalier. James scored 10 points in an 80–68 season-ending loss to Notre Dame High School at the Division I regional final. As a senior, he averaged 14.2 points, 5.5 rebounds, 2.4 assists and 1.8 steals per game, leading his team to a 23–11 record. He was selected to play in the McDonald's All-American Game and was named to the United States team for the Nike Hoop Summit.

Recruiting
By 2015, James was receiving scholarship offers and letters of interest from college basketball programs, according to his father, who commented, "It should be a violation. You shouldn't be recruiting 10-year-old kids." In 2016, ESPN reported that James held offers from Duke and Kentucky. Entering high school, analysts viewed him a high major NCAA Division I prospect. He first appeared in recruiting rankings before his sophomore season, with 247Sports and ESPN rating him a four-star recruit and a top-30 player in the 2023 class. Early in his junior season, James fell to 52nd and 49th in rankings by 247Sports and ESPN, respectively, and he dropped 31 spots to number 60 in rankings by Rivals in June 2022. In his senior season, he rose in rankings from each service. On January 17, 2023, the Los Angeles Times reported that his three finalists are Ohio State, Oregon and USC.

Player profile
James stands  and can play the point guard and shooting guard positions. He has a "smooth shooting stroke" and is an adept ball handler and passer. Scouts have additionally commended his "feel for the game" and poise on the basketball court.

James has worn the number 0 jersey because it is the number worn by his favorite NBA player, Russell Westbrook. Entering eighth grade, he switched to a number 23 jersey in honor of his father.

Personal life
James' godfather is NBA All-Star Chris Paul. In 2020, James signed with esports organization FaZe Clan.

References

External links

Sierra Canyon Trailblazers bio

2004 births
African-American basketball players
American men's basketball players
Basketball players from Los Angeles
FaZe Clan
Guards (basketball)
Bronny
Living people
Sierra Canyon School alumni
Sportspeople from Los Angeles
Twitch (service) streamers